The Bodri River is a river in Kendal Regency, northern Central Java, Indonesia. The Bodri River flows from the south to north into Java Sea.

Geography 
The river flows along the central north area of Java with predominantly tropical monsoon climate. The annual average temperature in the area is 25 °C. The warmest month is October, when the average temperature is around 28 °C, and the coldest is January, at 24 °C. The average annual rainfall is 3459 mm. The wettest month is January, with an average of 713 mm rainfall, and the driest is September, with 33 mm rainfall.

Hydrology 
The Bodri River rises in North Serayu Mountains from Mount Sundoro (3,150 m) at the village of Canggal, Candiroto District, Temanggung Regency. It also receives streams from the north slope of Mount Prahu (2,590 m) at Dieng Plateau, Mount Beser (1,036 m), Mount Kepiting (1,169 m) and also from Mount Ungaran (2,050 m) in Semarang Regency. The upstream in Temanggung Regency is called "Lutut River" (Sungai Lutut). The river discharges into Java Sea.

The river flows through two regencies: Temanggung Regency at the upstream and Kendal Regency in the middle and the downstream. In Temanggung Regency, this river traverses the districts of Candiroto, Bejen, and Gemawang. In Kendal Regency it crosses the districts of Singorojo, Patean, Pegandon, Gemuh, Cepiring and Patebon.

Tributaries 
Some main tributaries of the Bodri River are:
 Penggung River
 Logung River
 Ringin River
 Kaliputih River
 Kalipupu River
 Lowungu River
 Trocoh River
 Manggung River

Use 
The inhabitants along the Bodri River use the water for fisheries, either by traditional fishing or with nets. The high discharge of the river is also used for irrigation passing some dams, such as Juwero Dam at the border of Wonosari village, Pegandon District, with Triharjo village, Gemuh District, Kendal Regency. In the river mouth area it has a port for the fishermen in the north coast with a fish auction place. There is a tourist attraction "Curug Guwung" at the upstream of the Bodri River, at the Gunungpayung village, Candiroto District, Temanggung Regency

See also
List of rivers of Indonesia
List of rivers of Java

References

Rivers of Central Java
Rivers of Indonesia